Artlink, formerly titled Artlink: Australian contemporary art quarterly, is a themed magazine covering contemporary art and ideas from Australia and the Asia-Pacific.  It covers a diverse range of issues, including social and environmental issues as well as media arts, science and technology.

History
Artlink was established in 1981 by Stephanie Britton as a bi-monthly newsletter, published in black and white by Art Link Incorporated. Its initial funding came from the South Australian Department for the Arts, and the magazine was run by a committee on which the following bodies were represented: the Experimental Art Foundation, the Contemporary Art Society, the South Australian School of Art Student Union, the Women's Art Movement, and the Friends of the Art Gallery of South Australia.

From 1986 it developed national coverage, with regional editors, and from 1988 began quarterly publication, with themed issues beginning in 1989. In 1994 Artlink Australia was created to replace Art Link Inc.

Since June 2011, Artlink has published regular editions of Artlink Indigenous, beginning with three-year project to produced annual issues. The first issue was guest edited by Daniel Browning and Stephanie Radok, and was also launched in London, with the assistance of the Australian High Commission. commissioned by Aboriginal and Torres Strait Islander writers, editors and artists.

In 2014, Stephanie Britton retired from the position of Executive Editor, and Eve Sullivan was appointed to the position in July 2014. Sullivan left in February 2021, and Una Rey succeeded her as editor in 2022.

Description
Artlink is listed on the Australian Research Council's Excellence in Research for Australia (ERA) 2018 journal list, meaning that it meets the criteria of being academic or scholarly, and publishes original peer-reviewed research.

The National Library of Australia's catalogue entry gives Artlink: Australian contemporary art quarterly as an alternative title.

Publication and funding
Published by Artlink Australia, based in the Adelaide suburb of Glenside, Artlink receives support from the Australian Government via the Australia Council for the Arts and other funds, the South Australian Department of the Premier and Cabinet, and private sponsors.

Governance and staff
 Una Rey is editor and Megan Rainey is the CEO of Artlink. There is a board of directors comprising five members.

Distribution
 Artlink is distributed by Ovato Retail Distribution Australia  to newsagents in Australia and New Zealand, and by Artlink Australia to independent bookshops, galleries and museums.

Issues are also available as PDFs via the website, and the full text version is available via APAIS until December 2013.

References

External links
 

1981 establishments in Australia
Contemporary art magazines
Bi-monthly magazines published in Australia
Magazines established in 1981
Quarterly magazines published in Australia
Mass media in Adelaide
Arts magazines published in Australia